Oz, officially the Sydney–Melbourne Conurbation, is a fictional mega-city in the Judge Dredd comic, located in the south east of Australia. It was the main setting for the Judge Dredd strip Oz. Like most of the mega-cities of the time Oz is ruled by a Judge system. According to the Judge Dredd D20 RPG Oz was where the sport of sky surfing began. 
Characteristics: The Judges of Oz are shown in the Judge Dredd story to be involved in gambling and are shown to be only half-heartedly trying to prevent the 'Supersurf' race.
Geography: The Mega-city of 'Oz' or 'Sydney-Melbourne Conurbation' occupies the greater part of the territory currently occupied by the Australian states of New South Wales and Victoria. The Sydney Opera House is still standing when Judge Dredd visits Oz, and later in the story it is shown that the Australian outback has become to Oz what the 'Cursed Earth' is to the Mega Cities of the North American Continent. The megalith Uluru also features prominently in the story 'Oz'.

British comics